Liesbeth Simone Vosmaer-de Bruin ( de Bruin, born 9 January 1946) is a retired Dutch rower. She competed at the 1976 Summer Olympics in the coxed fours, together with Hette Borrias, Myriam van Rooyen-Steenman, Ans Gravesteijn and Monique Pronk, and finished in fifth place. She won a European title in this event in 1973, with Hette Borrias, Myriam van Rooyen-Steenman, Yvonne Vischschraper and Liesbeth Pascal-de Graaff. At the world championships, her team was fifth in 1975 and seventh in 1977 and 1978.

References

1946 births
Living people
Dutch female rowers
Olympic rowers of the Netherlands
Rowers at the 1976 Summer Olympics
Rowers from Amsterdam
European Rowing Championships medalists
World Rowing Championships medalists for the Netherlands